Alena Schillerová (born 18 March 1964) is a Czech politician and lawyer who served as Minister of Finance in the government of Prime Minister Andrej Babiš from 2017 to 2021. Schillerová is the first woman in the history of the Czech Republic to hold the office.

Early life and education
In 1988 Schillerová was awarded a JUDr. degree in law from Masaryk University in Brno. In 2000 she received a PhD. in administrative and agricultural cooperative law from the same university.

Career
From 1991 to 2012 Schillerová was employed by the Tax Office of Brno-Country District, becoming Deputy Director in 1995 and Director in 2006. From the beginning on 2013 she worked for 18 months as Deputy Director of the Tax Office for the South Moravian Region, as well as heading the Methodology and Tax Performance Department. She then became the Director of the Legal and Tax Process Department of the General Financial Directorate, before being appointed Deputy Minister of Finance for Taxes and Excise at the Czech Ministry of Finance at the beginning of 2016.

In May 2017, Andrej Babiš proposed that Schillerová should replace him as Minister of Finance. At the time, Prime Minister Bohuslav Sobotka rejected her nomination, saying she was too close to Babiš; instead, Ivan Pilný was nominated.

On 13 December 2017, following that year's national elections, Schillerová was appointed Minister of Finance in the cabinet of incoming Prime Minister Andrej Babiš, as an independent. On 30 April 2019 she was appointed Deputy Prime Minister of the Czech Republic.

During her time in office, the government introduced a 7% digital tax in 2019 aimed at boosting state revenue by taxing advertising by global internet giants like Google and Facebook, based on earlier ideas for pan-European legislation.

Other activities
 Multilateral Investment Guarantee Agency (MIGA), World Bank Group, Ex-Officio Member of the Board of Governors (2017–2021)
 World Bank, Ex-Officio Member of the Board of Governors (2017–2021)
 European Investment Bank (EIB), Ex-Officio Member of the Board of Governors (2017–2021)
 European Bank for Reconstruction and Development (EBRD), Ex-Officio Member of the Board of Governors (2017–2021)

Personal life
The Czech government's official website states that she speaks English, German and Russian. However, her proficiency in English came under scrutiny in 2020 after a series of reports by Czech news outlets questioning it. Further concerns were raised by the minister's refusal to conduct interviews in English and her reported lack of participation in EU meetings conducted in English.

References

1964 births
Living people
Politicians from Brno
Finance ministers of the Czech Republic
Masaryk University alumni
Female finance ministers
Women government ministers of the Czech Republic
ANO 2011 Government ministers
ANO 2011 MPs
Members of the Chamber of Deputies of the Czech Republic (2021–2025)